Hydromorphus dunni, also known as Dunn's water snake, is a snake of the colubrid family. It is found in Panama.

References

Hydromorphus
Snakes of North America
Reptiles of Panama
Endemic fauna of Panama
Taxa named by Joseph Richard Slevin
Reptiles described in 1942